Percy Cockings (19 December 1884 – 19 May 1963) was a British wrestler. He competed at the 1908 Summer Olympics and the 1912 Summer Olympics.

References

External links
 

1884 births
1963 deaths
Olympic wrestlers of Great Britain
Wrestlers at the 1908 Summer Olympics
Wrestlers at the 1912 Summer Olympics
British male sport wrestlers
People from Bloomsbury
Sportspeople from London
20th-century British people